Edwin "Ted" G. Abel is an American neuroscientist, and the founding Director of the Iowa Neuroscience Institute at University of Iowa and previously the Brush Family Professor of Biology at University of Pennsylvania.

Abel obtained his doctorate in biochemistry and molecular biology from Harvard University, after working there under mentorship from Tom Maniatis. He then became a postdoc under mentorship of Eric Kandel at Columbia University.

Abel is an Elected Fellow of the American Association for the Advancement of Science and editor-in-chief of Neurobiology of Learning and Memory.

References

External links

Year of birth missing (living people)
Living people
American neuroscientists
Harvard Graduate School of Arts and Sciences alumni
University of Iowa faculty
University of Pennsylvania faculty
Fellows of the American Association for the Advancement of Science
Members of the National Academy of Medicine